Matthew "Matt" Jarvis is a Canadian professional poker player from Surrey, British Columbia, known for his November Nine appearance in the 2010 World Series of Poker Main Event.  He earned his first World Series of Poker bracelet at the 2011 World Series of Poker.

Career
In 2010, he opted not to participate in most of the preliminary World Series of Poker (WSOP) events. Instead, he participated in several no limit hold 'em events at the June 2010 Venetian Deep Stack Extravaganza III, placing in the money in three of them. At the 7,319-player 2010 World Series of Poker US$10,000 World Championship No Limit Hold'em Event 57 (2010 WSOP Main Event), he entered the final table fifth in chips. During the interim between the main summer WSOP events and the November Nine final table he earned a Canadian Open Poker Championship victory in the August 23, 2010 64-player  No Limit Hold'em - Heads-Up Championship, earning . At his November Nine appearance at the final table of the 2010 WSOP Main Event he placed 8th, earning US$1,045,743 for his first WSOP in the money finish. He was eliminated after getting  all-in preflop, falling behind on the flop and turning a full house, but losing to a higher rivered full house against Michael Mizrachi's  when the cards ran .

Jarvis plays online under the name Jarfish (with variations on the upper and lower cases at different poker networks).  He has numerous five-figure online victories and in 2011 established his online career high prize with a victory in the 387-player July 23, 2011 $2000+100 Absolute Poker - UBOC16 $750K GTD High Roller No Limit Hold 'em Tournament for a prize of $193,500.

World Series of Poker

Jarvis earned his first World Series of Poker Bracelet at by winning the 732-player $5,000 2011 No-Limit Hold'em / Six Handed Event 40 for a prize of US$808,538. It was his tenth career WSOP event and the victory made him the third November Nine player (after Eric Buchman and Phil Ivey) to win a bracelet in the following year's WSOP.

Personal
Jarvis was born in Richmond, British Columbia.

Notes

External links
Jarvis at Hendonmob.com
Jarvis at Bluff Magazine
Jarvis at Card Player
Jarvis at WSOP.com
November nine elimination card

Canadian poker players
Living people
World Series of Poker bracelet winners
People from Surrey, British Columbia
Year of birth missing (living people)
People from Richmond, British Columbia